is the first single by the Japanese pop group ZYX. The single was released on August 6, 2003, and reached number 18 on the Oricon charts, charting for four weeks.

CD track list
Iku ZYX! Fly High
Gatamekira (ZYX ver.) ( ガタメキラ (ZYX ver.): "Gotta Make It Love" (ZYX ver.) ) (T&C Bomber cover)
Iku ZYX! Fly High (instrumental)

Single V track list 
Iku ZYX! Fly High
Iku ZYX! Fly High (dance version)
Making of

External links
 Hello! Project discography 

2003 singles